Yurii Anatoliiovych Shapovalov ((born 14 March 1972, Kremenchuk, Poltava Oblast, Ukraine) is a Ukrainian politician. He is a People's Deputy of Ukraine of the 7th, 8th  and 9th convocations.

Biography
Shapovavlov studied at eight-year school № 15 and secondary school № 21 of Kremenchuk. He graduated from Kharkiv National Automobile and Highway University, field of study “Automobiles and Automobile Industry”, study program “Technical operation of vehicles”, qualification of mechanical engineer. He was a regional deputy director of the company “Foxtrot” in Kremenchuk.
2010-2012 – a deputy of the Kremenchuk city council for the party Front for Change.

Parliamentary activities
People's Deputy of Ukraine of the 7th convocation (2012-2014). He was elected in constituency 146 (Kremenchuk, Poltava Oblast) as an independent politician with 34.35% of the votes but in parliament joined the Party of Regions faction. In February 2014 he left this faction and joined the parliamentary group "Sovereign European Ukraine". The Chairmanship of the Subcommittee on Antimonopoly Policy and Development of Economic Competition of the Verkhovna Rada of Ukraine Committee on Entrepreneurship, Regulatory and Antimonopoly Policy.

In the 2014 Ukrainian parliamentary election Shapovavlov was reelected in constituency 146 and thus became People’s Deputy of Ukraine of the 8th  convocation (2014-2019). This time he was elected with 22.67% of the votes. Until 2016 he was a member of the parliamentary group "People's Will". He then became a member of the parliamentary group "Revival". Secretary of the Verkhovna Rada of Ukraine Committee on Transport.

In the July 2019 Ukrainian  parliamentary election Shapovavlov was elected as a self-nominee a People’s Deputy of Ukraine of the 9th convocation, again in constituency 146. In this election he was voted to parliament with 27.08% of the votes.
Faction: Member of the parliamentary group "For the Future". 
Post: Secretary of the Verkhovna Rada of Ukraine Committee on Energy, Housing and Utilities Services. In the 2019 Ukrainian  parliamentary election Shapovalov's nephew Oleksiy Movchan was also elected to parliament for the Servant of the People party in constituency 150. Movchan was elected with 42.54% of the votes.

References

1972 births
Living people
People from Kremenchuk
Seventh convocation members of the Verkhovna Rada
Eighth convocation members of the Verkhovna Rada
Ninth convocation members of the Verkhovna Rada
Front for Change (Ukraine) politicians
21st-century Ukrainian politicians